The Executioner (a.k.a. Mack Bolan) is a monthly men's action-adventure paperback book series (published from 1969 - 2020) following the exploits of the character Mack Bolan and his wars against organized crime and international terrorism. The series has sold more than 200 million copies since its 1969 debut installment, War Against the Mafia.

The regular series includes 464 novels (as of December 2020 when the series ended).  Every other month, the Executioner series was complemented by the release of a Super Bolan, which were twice the length of a standard Executioner novel. There were 178 "Super Bolans" (as of December, 2015 when that series ended).

The Executioner was created and initially written by American author Don Pendleton, who penned 37 of the original 38 Bolan novels (he did not write #16). In 1980, Pendleton licensed the rights to Gold Eagle and was succeeded by a collective of ghostwriters. Some Pinnacle printings in the middle of Pendleton's original series carried a photo and brief article on the author, showing that Pendleton was not just a "house name".

Pinnacle Books was bought by Kensington Publishing (Zebra Books and others), and retained the rights to the original 38 novels; they were briefly reissued in the late 1980s-early 1990s.

Since its inception in 1969, The Executioner series has spawned several spin-off series including Able Team (1982), Phoenix Force (1982), and Stony Man (the series into which Able Team and Phoenix Force were eventually merged in 1991). The Stony Man series began in 1991 with "Stony Man" #2 (since the first "Stony Man" novel was published as a one-shot back in 1983, titled "Stony Man Doctrine" which is also regarded as the first "Super Bolan" novel).

Spinoff series
In the Mack Bolan universe Stony Man is an anti-terrorist organization, with two teams - Able Team and Phoenix Force. Each had its own series of books from 1982 until 1991, when the publisher combined both series into Stony Man.

In addition, the Super Bolan series emerged in 1985, a separate series of Mack Bolan adventures that ran concurrently with the regular monthly series. These books were double the size of a regular Executioner novel and were released every other month. Technically the first "Super Bolan" book was Stony Man Doctrine (1983) which is also considered the first book in the "Stony Man" series. The Super Bolan's then commenced with Book #2 in 1985 and ran a total of 178 novels.

In France, a new spin-off series, Kira B., featuring Mack Bolan's "daughter" Kira, was introduced by the publisher Vauvenargues, in 2012. Written under the pen name Steven Belly, the series follows the adventures of Kira, a young woman who appeared in L'Exécuteur nº300: Le réseau Phénix, where she manipulated Mack Bolan to come out of retirement to fight against cyber-criminals. Since then, she has helped her "father" in his fight against crime and now is the heroine of her own, eponymous series.

There were 453 novels in the original Executioner series (1969-2017), plus the following spinoff series.....

The Executioner Mystery Magazine
In 1975, Leonard J. Ackerman Productions produced Don Pendleton's The Executioner Mystery Magazine, a digest-sized, pulp magazine anthology series along the same lines as the Alfred Hitchcock Mystery Magazine. The magazine had little connection to the Mack Bolan books save for the occasional story related to the Mafia. The magazine ran for only four issues, ending in August 1975, with the final issue titled simply The Executioner Mystery Magazine.

Other media

Audio books
Select Executioner titles were distributed on audiocassette by DH Audio through #241, although the company was dissolved in Fall 2001. These abridged versions of the books, read by Richard Rohan performing multiple voices, ran about 3 hours. Stony Man Doctrine was also published as an audio cassette tape.

The first three books in the Executioner series in audio format were published by Books in Motion as cassette tapes.

Cutting Edge Audio published the Executioner & Stony Man series on audio, starting in October 2004 and beginning with Executioner 301 Blast Radius and Stony Man 68 Outbreak. They were available throughout North America and online via Cuttingaudio.com. The company had no plans for selling them through regular retail outlets. They stopped publishing them in 2006.

Movie screenplay
Joseph E. Levine contracted Richard Maibaum in 1972 to write a screenplay, based on the fifth and sixth volumes, Continental Contract and Assault on Soho. Some Pinnacle printings at the time had a strapline in a corner of the cover with "Soon to be a major motion picture from Avco-Embassy."

A later attempt to adapt The Executioner to the screen by William Friedkin was to star Sylvester Stallone and Cynthia Rothrock, but the production was scrapped.

It was announced in August 2014, that Shane Salerno, Hollywood producer and screenwriter, has acquired the Executioner Mack Bolan Series of action/adventure novels for a film franchise.

Deadline reported that Warner Bros. has acquired the film rights of the book series with Bradley Cooper starring as Bolan, Shane Salerno writing and Todd Phillips directing.

Comics
Mack Bolan: The Executioner was a comic book adaptation of War Against the Mafia adapted by Don and Linda Pendleton, published in 1993 by Innovation Publishing with art by Sandu Florea.  Intended to run four issues, the final installment was not published due to Innovation closing.

The Executioner: Death Squad was adapted by Linda Pendleton with art by Sandu Florea.  It was a 128-page black and white comic, published in 1996 by Vivid Comics.

The Executioner was adapted into a five-part comic book series by IDW, written by Doug Wojtowicz and illustrated by S. I. Gallant. It was reissued as the graphic novel Don Pendleton's The Executioner: The Devil's Tool in November 2008.  The reissued version contained an introduction by Linda Pendleton, "Don Pendleton's Creation of Mack Bolan, The Executioner".

Podcast 
The Executioner books and spin-offs are featured on the August 5, 2019 episode of the Paperback Warrior podcast. The show's hosts, Eric Compton and Tom Simon, discuss the series' origins including its impact on popular culture. Additionally, the show spotlights key authors that contributed to the series and its spin-offs. During that episode, Eric Compton reviews Executioner #88 Baltimore Trackdown by Chet Cunningham.

Authors

Series listing

 001: War Against the Mafia
 002: Death Squad
 003: Battle Mask
 004: Miami Massacre
 005: Continental Contract
 006: Assault on Soho
 007: Nightmare in New York
 008: Chicago Wipeout
 009: Vegas Vendetta
 010: Caribbean Kill
 011: California Hit
 012: Boston Blitz
 013: Washington I.O.U.
 014: San Diego Siege
 015: Panic in Philly
 016: Sicilian Slaughter (written by "Jim Peterson," a pseudonym for William Crawford)
 017: Jersey Guns
 018: Texas Storm
 019: Detroit Deathwatch
 020: New Orleans Knockout
 021: Firebase Seattle
 022: Hawaiian Hellground
 023: St. Louis Showdown
 024: Canadian Crisis
 025: Colorado Kill-Zone
 026: Acapulco Rampage
 027: Dixie Convoy
 028: Savage Fire
 The Executioner's War Book  (not a novel, but an overview of the series to this point, with descriptions and schematic drawings of Bolan's weapons and War Wagon, lists of characters, excerpts from the novels, and letters from fans with Pendleton's original return mail replies)
 029: Command Strike
 030: Cleveland Pipeline
 031: Arizona Ambush
 032: Tennessee Smash
 033: Monday's Mob
 The Great American Detective Anthology (contains the Mack Bolan short story Willing To Kill)
 034: Terrible Tuesday
 035: Wednesday's Wrath
 036: Thermal Thursday
 037: Friday's Feast
 038: Satan's Sabbath (Pendleton's last)
 039: The New War (series was taken over at this point by a team of ghost writers as "Don Pendleton's Mack Bolan")
 040: Double Crossfire
 041: The Violent Streets
 042: The Iranian Hit (written by Stephen Mertz)
 043: Return to Vietnam (written by Stephen Mertz)
 044: Terrorist Summit
 045: Paramilitary Plot
 046: Bloodsport
 047: Renegade Agent
 048: The Libya Connection (written by Stephen Mertz)
 049: Doomsday Disciples
 050: Brothers in Blood
 051: Vulture's Vengeance
 052: Tuscany Terror (written by Stephen Mertz)
 053: The Invisible Assassins
 054: Mountain Rampage
 055: Paradine's Gauntlet
 056: Island Deathtrap
 057: Flesh Wounds
 058: Ambush on Blood River
 059: Crude Kill
 060: Sold for Slaughter
 061: Tiger War
 062: Day of Mourning (written by Stephen Mertz)
 063: The New War Book (not a novel, but an overview of the series post-Pinnacle)
 064: Dead Man Running (written by Stephen Mertz)
 065: Cambodia Clash
 066: Orbiting Omega
 067: Beirut Payback (written by Stephen Mertz)
 068: Prairie Fire
 069: Skysweeper
 070: Ice Cold Kill
 071: Blood Dues
 072: Hellbinder
 073: Appointment in Kabul (written by Stephen Mertz)
 074: Savannah Swingsaw
 075: The Bone Yard
 076: Teheran Wipeout (written by Stephen Mertz)
 077: Hollywood Hell
 078: Death Games
 079: Council of Kings
 080: Running Hot
 081: Shock Waves
 082: Hammerhead Reef
 083: Missouri Deathwatch
 084: Fastburn
 085: Sunscream
 086: Hell's Gate
 087: Hellfire Crusade
 088: Baltimore Trackdown
 089: Defenders and Believers
 090: Blood Heat Zero
 091: The Trial
 092: Moscow Massacre (written by Stephen Mertz)
 093: The Fire Eaters
 094: Save the Children (written by Stephen Mertz)
 095: Blood and Thunder
 096: Death Has a Name
 097: Meltdown
 098: Black Dice
 099: Code of Dishonor
 100: Blood Testament
 101: Eternal Triangle
 102: Split Image
 103: Assault on Rome
 104: Devil's Horn
 105: Countdown to Chaos
 106: Run to Ground
 107: American Nightmare
 108: Time to Kill
 109: Hong Kong Hit List
 110: Trojan Horse
 111: The Fiery Cross
 112: Blood of the Lion
 113: Vietnam Fallout
 114: Cold Judgment
 115: Circle of Steel
 116: The Killing Urge
 117: Vendetta in Venice
 118: Warrior's Revenge
 119: Line of Fire
 120: Border Sweep
 121: Twisted Path
 122: Desert Strike
 123: War Born
 124: Night Kill
 125: Dead Man's Tale
 126: Death Wind
 127: Kill Zone
 128: Sudan Slaughter
 129: Haitian Hit
 130: Dead Line
 131: Ice Wolf
 132: The Big Kill
 133: Blood Run
 134: White Line War
 135: Devil Force
 136: Down and Dirty
 137: Battle Lines
 138: Kill Trap
 139: Cutting Edge
 140: Wild Card
 141: Direct Hit
 142: Fatal Error
 143: Helldust Cruise
 144: Whipsaw
 145: Chicago Payoff
 146: Deadly Tactics
 147: Payback Game
 148: Deep and Swift
 149: Blood Rules (The Medellin Trilogy #1)
 150: Death Load
 151: Message to Medellin (The Medellin Trilogy #3)
 152: Combat Stretch
 153: Firebase Florida
 154: Night Hit
 155: Hawaiian Heat
 156: Phantom Force
 157: Cayman Strike
 158: Firing Line
 159: Steel and Flame
 160: Storm Warning (Storm Trilogy #1)
 161: Eye of the Storm (Storm Trilogy #2)
 162: Colors of Hell
 163: Warrior's Edge
 164: Death Trail
 165: Fire Sweep
 166: Assassin's Creed
 167: Double Action
 168: Blood Price
 169: White Heat
 170: Baja Blitz
 171: Deadly Force
 172: Fast Strike
 173: Capital Hit
 174: Battle Plan (Freedom Trilogy #1)
 175: Battle Ground (Freedom Trilogy #2)
 176: Ransom Run
 177: Evil Code
 178: Black Hand
 179: War Hammer
 180: Force Down
 181: Shifting Target
 182: Lethal Agent
 183: Clean Sweep
 184: Death Warrant
 185: Sudden Fury
 186: Fire Burst (Terror Trilogy #1)
 187: Cleansing Flame (Terror Trilogy #2)
 188: War Paint
 189: Wellfire
 190: Killing Range
 191: Extreme Force
 192: Maximum Impact
 193: Hostile Action
 194: Deadly Contest
 195: Select Fire (Arms Trilogy #1)
 196: Triburst (Arms Trilogy #2)
 197: Armed Force (Arms Trilogy #3)
 198: Shoot Down
 199: Rogue Agent
 200: Crisis Point
 201: Prime Target
 202: Combat Zone
 203: Hard Contact
 204: Rescue Run
 205: Hell Road
 206: Hunting Cry
 207: Freedom Strike
 208: Death Whisper
 209: Asian Crucible
 210: Fire Lash (Red Dragon Trilogy #1)
 211: Steel Claws (Red Dragon Trilogy #2)
 212: Ride the Beast (Red Dragon Trilogy #3)
 213: Blood Harvest
 214: Fission Fury
 215: Fire Hammer
 216: Death Force
 217: Fight or Die
 218: End Game
 219: Terror Intent
 220: Tiger Stalk
 221: Blood and Fire
 222: Patriot Gambit (American Trilogy #1)
 223: Hour of Conflict  (American Trilogy #2)
 224: Call to Arms (American Trilogy #3)
 225: Body Armor
 226: Red Horse
 227: Blood Circle
 228: Terminal Option
 229: Zero Tolerance
 230: Deep Attack
 231: Slaughter Squad
 232: Jackal Hunt
 233: Tough Justice
 234: Target Command (Power Trilogy #1)
 235: Plague Wind (Power Trilogy #2)
 236: Vengeance Rising (Power Trilogy #3)
 237: Hellfire Trigger
 238: Crimson Tide
 239: Hostile Proximity
 240: Devil's Guard
 241: Evil Reborn (The Hydra Trilogy #1)
 242: Doomsday Conspiracy (The Hydra Trilogy #2)
 243: Assault Reflex (The Hydra Trilogy #3)
 244: Judas Kill
 245: Virtual Destruction
 246: Blood of the Earth
 247: Black Dawn Rising
 248: Rolling Death
 249: Shadow Target
 250: Warning Shot (The Border Fire Trilogy #1)
 251: Kill Radius (The Border Fire Trilogy #2)
 252: Death Line (The Border Fire Trilogy #3)
 253: Risk Factor
 254: Chill Effect
 255: War Bird
 256: Point of Impact
 257: Precision Play
 258: Target Lock
 259: Nightfire (Lord of the Seas Trilogy #1)
 260: Dayhunt (Lord of the Seas Trilogy #2)
 261: Dawnkill (Lord of the Seas Trilogy #3)
 262: Trigger Point (COMCON Wars #1)
 263: Skysniper
 264: Iron Fist (COMCON Wars #2)
 265: Freedom Force
 266: Ultimate Price (COMCON Wars #3)
 267: Invisible Invader
 268: Shattered Trust (The Conspiracy Trilogy #1)
 269: Shifting Shadows (The Conspiracy Trilogy #2)
 270: Judgment Day (The Conspiracy Trilogy #3)
 271: Cyberhunt
 272: Stealth Striker
 273: Uforce
 274: Rogue Target
 275: Crossed Borders
 276: Leviathan
 277: Dirty Mission
 278: Triple Reverse
 279: Fire Wind
 280: Fear Rally
 281: Blood Stone
 282: Jungle Conflict
 283: Ring of Retaliation
 284: Devil's Army (The Doomsday Trilogy #1)
 285: Final Strike (The Doomsday Trilogy #2)
 286: Armageddon Exit (The Doomsday Trilogy #3)
 287: Rogue Warrior
 288: Arctic Blast
 289: Vendetta Force
 290: Pursued
 291: Blood Trade
 292: Savage Game
 293: Death Merchants
 294: Scorpion Rising
 295: Hostile Alliance
 296: Nuclear Game (The Moon Shadow Trilogy #1)
 297: Deadly Pursuit (The Moon Shadow Trilogy #2)
 298: Final Play (The Moon Shadow Trilogy #3)
 299: Dangerous Encounter
 300: Warrior's Requiem
 301: Blast Radius
 302: Shadow Search
 303: Sea of Terror
 304: Soviet Specter
 305: Point Position
 306: Mercy Mission
 307: Hard Pursuit
 308: Into the Fire (OrgCrime Trilogy #1)
 309: Flames of Fury (OrgCrime Trilogy #2)
 310: Killing Heat (OrgCrime Trilogy #3)
 311: Night of the Knives
 312: Death Gamble
 313: Lockdown
 314: Lethal Payload
 315: Agent of Peril
 316: Poison Justice
 317: Hour of Judgement
 318: Code of Resistance
 319: Entry Point (The Carnivore Project #1)
 320: Exit Code (The Carnivore Project #2)
 321: Suicide Highway
 322: Time Bomb
 323: Soft Target
 324: Terminal Zone
 325: Edge of Hell
 326: Blood Tide
 327: Serpent's Lair
 328: Triangle of Terror
 329: Hostile Crossing
 330: Dual Action
 331: Assault Force
 332: Slaughter House
 333: Aftershock
 334: Jungle Justice
 335: Blood Vector
 336: Homeland Terror
 337: Tropic Blast
 338: Nuclear Reaction
 339: Deadly Contact
 340: Splinter Cell
 341: Rebel Force
 342: Double Play
 343: Border War
 344: Primal Law
 345: Orange Alert
 346: Vigilante Run
 347: Dragon's Den
 348: Carnage Code
 349: Firestorm
 350: Volatile Agent
 351: Hell Night
 352: Killing Trade
 353: Black Death Reprise
 354: Ambush Force
 355: Outback Assault
 356: Defense Breach
 357: Extreme Justice
 358: Blood Toll
 359: Desperate Passage
 360: Mission to Burma
 361: Final Resort
 362: Patriot Acts
 363: Face of Terror
 364: Hostile Odds
 365: Collision Course
 366: Pele's Fire
 367: Loose Cannon
 368: Crisis Nation
 369: Dangerous Tides
 370: Dark Alliance
 371: Fire Zone
 372: Lethal Compound
 373: Code of Honor
 374: System Corruption
 375: Salvador Strike
 376: Frontier Fury
 377: Desperate Cargo
 378: Death Run
 379: Deep Recon
 380: Silent Threat
 381: Killing Ground
 382: Threat Factor
 383: Raw Fury
 384: Cartel Clash
 385: Recovery Force
 386: Crucial Intercept
 387: Powder Burn
 388: Final Coup
 389: Deadly Command
 390: Toxic Terrain
 391: Enemy Agents
 392: Shadow Hunt
 393: Stand Down
 394: Trial by Fire
 395: Hazard Zone
 396: Fatal Combat
 397: Damage Radius
 398: Battle Cry
 399: Nuclear Storm
 400: Blind Justice (March 2012)
 401: Jungle Hunt (April 2012)
 402: Rebel Trade (May 2012)
 403: Line of Honor (June 2012)
 404: Final Judgement (July 2012)
 405: Lethal Diversion (August 2012)
 406: Survival Mission (September 2012)
 407: Throw Down (October 2012)
 408: Border Offensive (November 2012)
 409: Blood Vendetta (December 2012)
 410: Hostile Force (January 2013)
 411: Cold Fusion (February 2013)
 412: Night's Reckoning (March 2013)
 413: Double Cross (April 2013)
 414: Prison Code (May 2013)
 415: Ivory Wave (June 2013)
 416: Extraction (July 2013)
 417: Rogue Assault (August 2013)
 418: Viral Siege (September 2013)
 419: Sleeping Dragons (October 2013)
 420: Rebel Blast (November 2013)
 421: Hard Targets (December 2013)
 422: Nigeria Meltdown (January 2014)
 423: Breakout (February 2014)
 424: Amazon Impunity (March 2014)
 425: Patriot Strike (April 2014)
 426: Pirate offensive (May 2014)
 427: Pacific Creed (June 2014)
 428: Desert Impact (July 2014)
 429: Arctic Kill (August 2014)
 430: Deadly Salvage (September 2014)
 431: Maximum Chaos (October 2014)
 432: Slayground (November 2014)
 433: Point Blank (December 2014)
 434: Savage Deadlock (January 2015)
 435: Dragon Key  (February 2015)
 436: Perilous Cargo (March 2015)
 437: Assassins Tripwire (April 2015)
 438: The Cartel Hit (May 2015)
 439: Blood Rites (June 2015)
 440: Killpath (July 2015)
 441: Murder Island (August 2015)
 442: Syrian Rescue (September 2015)
 443: Uncut Terror (October 2015)
 444: Dark Savior (November 2015)
 445: Final Assault (December 2015)
 446: Kill Squad (March 2016)
 447: Death Game (June 2016)
 448: Terrorist Dispatch (September 2016)
 449: Combat Machines (December 2016)
 450: Omega Cult (March 2017)
 451: Fatal Prescription (June 2017)
 452: Death List (September 2017)
 453: Rogue Elements (December 2017)
 454: Enemies Within (2018)
 455: Chicago Vendetta (2018)
 456:  Thunder Down Under (2018)
 457:  Dying Art (2018)
 458:  Killing Kings (2019)
 459:  Stealth Assassin (2019)
 460:  Lethal Vengeance (2019)
 461:  Cold Fury (2019)
 462:  Cyberthreat (2020)
 463:  Righteous Fear (2020)
 464:  Blood Vortex (2020)

List of SuperBolan books

 001: Stony Man Doctrine (1983)
 002: Terminal Velocity (April 1984)
 003: Resurrection Day (February 1985)
 004: Dirty War (September 1985)
 005: Flight 741 (April 1986)
 006: Dead Easy (September 1986)
 007: Sudden Death (January 1987)
 008: Rogue Force (May 1987)
 009: Tropic Heat (August 1987)
 010: Fire in the Sky (1988)
 011: Anvil of Hell (March 1988)
 012: Flash Point (July 1988)
 013: Flesh and Blood (October 1988)
 014: Moving Target (January 1989)
 015: Tightrope (April 1989)
 016: Blowout (1989)
 017: Blood Fever (October 1989)
 018: Knockdown (February 1990)
 019: Assault (April 1990)
 020: Backlash (September 1990)
 021: Siege (November 1990)
 022: Blockade (March 1991)
 023: Evil Kingdom (June 1991)
 024: Counterblow (August 1991)
 025: Hardline (November 1991)
 026: Firepower (February 1992)
 027: Storm Burst (Storm Trilogy #3) (June 1992)
 028: Intercept (August 1992)
 029: Lethal Impact (November 1992)
 030: Deadfall (Jan 1993)
 031: Onslaught (May 1993)
 032: Battle Force (Freedom Trilogy #3) (July 1993)
 033: Rampage (November 1993)
 034: Takedown (January 1994)
 035: Death's Head (March 1994)
 036: Hellground (June 1994)
 037: Inferno (Terror Trilogy #3) (July 1994)
 038: Ambush (September 1994)
 039: Blood Strike (November 1994)
 040: Killpoint (January 1995)
 041: Vendetta (March 1995)
 042: Stalk Line May 1995)
 043: Omega Game (August 1995)
 044: Shock Tactic (September 1995)
 045: Showdown (November 1995)
 046: Precision Kill (January 1996)
 047: Jungle Law (April 1996)
 048: Dead Center (June 1996)
 049: Tooth and Claw (August 1996)
 050: Red Heat (October 1996)
 051: Thermal Strike (December 1996)
 052: Day of the Vulture (February 1997)
 053: Flames of Wrath (March 1997)
 054: High Aggression (June 1997)
 055: Code of Bushido (August 1997)
 056: Terror Spin (October 1997)
 057: Judgment in Stone (December 1997)
 058: Rage for Justice (January 1998)
 059: Rebels and Hostiles (April 1998)
 060: Ultimate Game (April 1998)
 061: Blood Feud (June 1998)
 062: Renegade Force (October 1998)
 063: Retribution (December 1998)
 064: Initiation (Four Horsemen Trilogy #1) (February 1999)
 065: Cloud of Death (Four Horsemen Trilogy #2) (April 1999)
 066: Termination Point (Four Horsemen Trilogy #3) (June 1999)
 067: Hellfire Strike (August 1999)
 068: Code of Conflict (October 1999)
 069: Vengeance (December 1999)
 070: Executive Action (February 2000)
 071: Killsport (April 2000)
 072: Conflagration (June 2000)
 073: Storm Front (July 2000)
 074: War Season (September 2000)
 075: Evil Alliance (November 2000)
 076: Scorched Earth (January 2001)
 077: Deception (March 2001)
 078: Destiny's Hour (The Tyranny Files #1)(May 2001)
 079: Power of the Lance (The Tyranny Files #2)(July 2001)
 080: A Dying Evil (The Tyranny Files #3) (January 2002)
 081: Deep Treachery (November 2001)
 082: Warload (January 2002)
 083: Sworn Enemies (March 2002)
 084: Dark Truth (May 2002)
 085: Breakaway (July 2002)
 086: Blood and Sand (September 2002)
 087: Caged (November 2002)
 088: Sleepers (January 2003)
 089: Strike and Retrieve March (March 2003)
 090: Age of War (May 2003)
 091: Line of Control (Frontier Wars duology, #1) (July 2003)
 092: Breached (Frontier Wars duology, #2) (September 2003)
 093: Retaliation (Sequel to MB #300) (November 2003)
 094: Pressure Point (January 2004)
 095: Silent Running (March 2004)
 096: Stolen Arrows (May 2004)
 097: Zero Option (July 2004)
 098: Predator Paradise (September 2004)
 099: Circle of Deception (November 2004)
 100: Devil's Bargain (January 2005)
 101: False Front (March 2005)
 102: Lethal Tribute (May 2005)
 103: Season of Slaughter (July 2005)
 104: Point of Betrayal (September 2005)
 105: Ballistic Force (November 2005)
 106: Renegade (January 2006)
 107: Survival Reflex (March 2006)
 108: Path to War (May 2006)
 109: Blood Dynasty (July 2006)
 110: Ultimate Stakes (September 2006)
 111: State of Evil (November 2006)
 112: Force Lines (January 2007)
 113: Contagion Option (March 2007)
 114: Hellfire Code (May 2007)
 115: War Drums (July 2007)
 116: Ripple Effect (September 2007)
 117: Devil's Playground (November 2007)
 118: The Killing Rule (January 2008)
 119: Patriot Play (September 2007)
 120: Appointment in Baghdad (November 2007)
 121: Havana Five (July 2008)
 122: The Judas Project (October 2007)
 123: Plains of Fire (May 2008)
 124: Colony of Evil (January 2009)
 125: Hard Passage (March 2009)
 126: Interception (May 2009)
 127: Cold War Reprise (July 2009)
 128: Mission: Apocalypse (September 2009)
 129: Altered State (October 2009)
 130: Killing Game (November 2009)
 131: Diplomacy Directive (January 2010)
 132: Betrayed (March 2010)
 133: Sabotage (April 2010)
 134: Conflict Zone (June 2010)
 135: Blood Play (July 2010)
 136: Desert Fallout (September 2010)
 137: Extraordinary Rendition (October 2010)
 138: Devil's Mark (December 2010)
 139: Savage Rule (January 2011) 
 140: Infiltration (March 2011)
 141: Resurgence (April 2011)
 142: Kill Shot (June 2011)
 143: Stealth Sweep (July 2011)
 144: Grave Mercy (September 2011)
 145: Treason Play (October 2011)
 146: Assassin's Code (November 2011)
 147: Shadow Strike (January 2012)
 148: Decision Point (March 2012)
 149: Road of Bones (April 2012)
 150: Radical Edge (June 2012)
 151: Fireburst (July 2012)
 152: Oblivion Pact (September 2012)
 153: Enemy Arsenal (October 2012)
 154: State of War (December 2012)
 155: Ballistic (January 2013)
 156: Escalation Tactic (March 2013)
 157: Crisis Diplomacy (April 2013)
 158: Apocalypse Ark (June 2013)
 159: Lethal Stakes (July 2013)
 160: Illicit Supply (September 2013)
 161: Explosive Demand (October 2013)
 162: Ground Zero (December 2013)
 163: Jungle Firestorm (January 2014)
 164: Terror Ballot (March 2014)
 165: Death Metal (April 2014)
 166: Justice Run (June 2014)
 167: China White (July 2014)
 168: Payback (September 2014)
 169: Chain Reaction (October 2014)
 170: Nightmare Army (December 2014)
 171: Critical Exposure (January 2015)
 172: Insurrection (March 2015)
 173: Armed Response (April 2015)
 174: Desert Falcons (June 2015)
 175: Ninja Assault (July 2015)
 176: Lethal Risk (September 2015)
 177: Dead Reckoning (October 2015)
 178: War Everlasting (December 2015)

List of Kira B. books
 Kira 1: Ondes de Choc dans l'Oregon (2012, Shockwaves in Oregon) 
 Kira 2: L'Aigle de Brandebourg (2013, Brandeburger Eagle)
 Kira 3: Neige de sang sur Oslo (2013)
 Kira 4: Crisis (2013)
 Kira 5: La Quadrature sibérienne (2013)

References

External links
 MackBolan.com
 Official website of Don Pendleton, the creator of The Executioner, Mack Bolan Series
 executionerseries.com  Original Executioner Series

American adventure novels
Book series introduced in 1969
Fictional vigilantes
Male characters in literature
Novel series